The Massacre of April 7, 1947 (popularly in  darbat saligan 'Strike of the Senegalese,' more officially:  'Massacre of April 7' or  'Events of April 7') was a massacre of working-class Moroccan civilians in Casablanca committed by Senegalese Tirailleurs in the service of the French colonial empire. The attack was instigated by the French authorities in an attempt to disrupt the visit of Sultan Muhammad V to the Tangier International Zone to deliver the Tangier Speech demanding the independence of Morocco and the unification of its territories.

History 
In the days leading up to the sultan's speech, French colonial forces in Casablanca, specifically Senegalese Tirailleurs serving the French colonial empire, carried out a massacre of working class Moroccans. The massacre lasted for about 24 hours from 7–8 April 1947, as the tirailleurs fired randomly into residential buildings in working-class neighborhoods, killing 180 Moroccan civilians. The conflict was instigated in attempt to sabotage the Sultan's journey to Tangier, though after having returned to Casablanca to comfort the families of the victims, the Sultan then proceeded to Tangier to deliver the historic speech.

References 

1947 in Morocco
Casablanca
History of Morocco
Massacres in 1947
Massacres committed by France
Working class in Africa
Massacres in Morocco